is a railway station on the Ōito Line in the village of Otari, Kitaazumi District, Nagano Prefecture, Japan. The station is numbered "9". The station is on the electrical borderline of the JR East and JR West systems and operations are shared between the two companies. The section north of this station, operated by JR West is not electrified and all JR East services terminate here.

Lines
Minami-Otari Station is served by the Ōito Line and is 70.1 kilometers from the starting point of the line at Matsumoto Station.

Station layout
Minami-Otari Station consists of a one ground-level side platform and one island platform serving three tracks, connected by a footbridge. The station has a "Midori no Madoguchi" staffed ticket office.

Platforms

Passenger statistics
In fiscal 2015, the station was used by an average of 121 passengers daily (boarding passengers only).

Surrounding area
Otari village hall

See also
 List of railway stations in Japan

References

External links
 JR East Minami-Otari Station
 JR West Minami-Otari Station

Railway stations in Nagano Prefecture
Ōito Line
Railway stations in Japan opened in 1935
Stations of East Japan Railway Company
Otari, Nagano